The discography of American country music singer Charly McClain consists of 15 studio albums, seven compilation albums, 39 singles, and one music video. Between 1976 and 1989, McClain charted 39 singles on the Billboard Hot Country Singles chart, including three Number One singles: "Who's Cheatin' Who" (1981), "Paradise Tonight" (1983), and "Radio Heart" (1985).

Studio albums

Compilation albums

Singles

Music videos

References

Country music discographies
Discographies of American artists